Clearwater Lake is a lake in Manitoba, Canada. It is the main geographical feature of Manitoba's Clearwater Lake Provincial Park, located northeast of The Pas in western Manitoba.

References

Lakes of Manitoba